Donald Tyerman  (1 March 1908 – 4 April 1981) was an English journalist and editor.

Early life
Tyerman was born in Middlesbrough, England. He contracted polio at the age of three and was paralysed from the neck down, although over the next ten years he did eventually get back full use of the whole of his body except his legs - he needed splints to walk for the rest of his life. He was educated at Great Ayton Friends' School and Gateshead Grammar School and Brasenose College, Oxford and from 1930 to 1936 lectured in history at University College, Southampton.

Career
In 1936 he became a journalist with The Economist and soon became extremely influential, serving as deputy editor from 1939 to 1944. From 1944 to 1956 he was assistant editor of The Times, and then returned to The Economist as editor. He served in this post until 1965.

He was appointed a Commander of the Order of the British Empire (CBE) in 1978.

References
Dictionary of National Biography

1908 births
1981 deaths
Academics of the University of Southampton
Alumni of Brasenose College, Oxford
Commanders of the Order of the British Empire
English male journalists
English newspaper editors
English magazine editors
People from Middlesbrough
People with polio
The Economist editors
The Times people